The Bronx Memoir Project: Vol. 1 is a published anthology by The Bronx Council on the Arts and brought forth through a series of workshops meant to empower Bronx residents and shed the stigma on the Bronx's burning past.

History
The Bronx Memoir Project was created as an ongoing collaboration between The Bronx Council on the Arts and other cultural institutions including: The Bronx Documentary Center, The Bronx Library Center, Edgar Allan Poe Park Visitor Center, Mindbuilders as well as other institutions and funded through a grant from the National Endowment for the Arts, secured by Bronx Writing Center Director Ms. Mario Romano in August 2013. The goal was to develop and refine memoir fragments written by people of all walks of life that share a common bond residing within the Bronx.

In March 2014, The Bronx Council on the Arts held writing workshops throughout the borough with the goal of capturing the great diversity of the Bronx. The workshops brought Bronx residents together from all walk of life but was focused on: youth, seniors and families; and had them participate in a series of workshops. The workshops facilitated by the Bronx Council of the Art director, Charlie Vazquez cultivated one's craft in memoir writing, and allowed them to use it as a tool to capture the Bronx through their prospective and away from the Bronx's burning past.

The participants in the workshops had some of their memoir pieces published in an anthology "Bronx Memoir Project Vol-1".

Bronx Memoir Project Volume 1
Published in November 2014 by BCA Media and edited by Bronx Writer Center Director, Charlie Vazquez. This is published anthology of memoir pieces written by participants in the workshop. A first of its kind anthology that bring readers into the Bronx through the eyes of its residents.

Participating Writers

Bronx Memoir Project Volume 2 
After great success in using memoir allowing readers experience the Bronx through the eyes of the people who call it home instead of the media depiction a second volume was created. The memoir was published in the Fall of 2017 and has returning voices but feature a lot of new writers who seek to showcase the Bronx as their home, instead of the media depiction of: The Bronx is Burning.

References

American non-fiction books
2014 non-fiction books
History of the Bronx
The Bronx in fiction